Laura Gulbe (born 27 February 1995) is a Latvian tennis player.

Gulbe was born in Riga. On 13 April 2015, she reached her best singles ranking of world number 898. On 7 October 2013, she peaked at world number 1131 in the doubles rankings.

Playing for Latvia at the Fed Cup, Gulbe has a win–loss record of 3–0.

Gulbe is the half-sister of professional tennis player Ernests Gulbis. Her father, Ainārs, is an investment businessman, and her mother's name is Vineta.  Her paternal grandfather, Alvils Gulbis, was one of the starting five players for Rīgas ASK, the Soviet basketball team that won the European Championships.

Laura graduated from Pepperdine University with a degree in International Business in Spring 2018.

Fed Cup participation

Doubles

References

External links 
 
 
 

1995 births
Living people
Sportspeople from Riga
Latvian female tennis players